Legend of the Dragon is a series produced by BKN International for CBBC consisting of 39 episodes. A third season was cancelled, leaving the show on a cliffhanger.

Synopsis
The show starts when the previous Golden Dragon has passed on to the afterlife and Ang and Ling Leung, seventeen-year-old fraternal twins, born in the year of the Dragon, are next in line for the Golden Dragon power band and user of its mystical abilities to defend the mortal world from evil. Ang has no belief that he will become the Golden Dragon, as Ling is the best fighter at the Dragon dojo. Ling is positive that she will become the Golden Dragon. However, when Master Chin Ho calls upon the power of the Golden Dragon to choose who will be the next golden Dragon, it chooses Ang. Humiliated and furious, Ling storms out of the temple and is tempted by the ultimate dark and evil power of the shadow Dragon. From then on, Ang is forced to fight his own twin sister.

In episode twenty-six,"Double Dragon", Ling is overtaken by even greater shadow magic by the revived Emperor of the Darkest Yin, who orders her to win the mystical power-band of the Golden Dragon from Ang. However, Master Chin reveals to Ling that the only way for her to rightfully claim the power-band is to kill him. Horrified, Ling fully breaks free of the darkness that has overwhelmed her so long, as she cannot end her own twin brother. Impressed, Chin says how it was all a test for Ling to follow her true path. He explains that, as Ang's twin sister, she can now become a Golden Dragon herself. Chin merging both the positive and negative energies of the Golden Dragon power-band and the Shadow Dragon band bestows even greater Dragon firepower onto Ang and Ling as double/twin Golden Dragons; and are now twice as strong when they work together as one.

The second season (which consisted of just thirteen episodes) begins with the reformed Ling finally back home as one of the Twin Golden Dragon alongside her twin brother. Now they, Chin, and the fellow Guardians of the Tiger and Monkey Temples are ready to put an end to the Zodiac Master and the Emperor of the Darkest Yin once and for all. However, the Emperor is on the move to regroup at the Temple of the Shadow Dragon, but not before he attacks and disintegrates the Temple of the Golden Dragons, leaving Ang and Ling's powerbands on the verge of powerlessness permanently. Luckily, Chin suggests going to long-lost Temple of the Shadow Dragon and utilize its vast amounts of negative energy to re-energize their powerbands fully.

As Ling was exposed to the evil energies of the Shadow Dragon for quite some time, she became easily tempted by the temple's negative influence on both her mind and spirit. However, with the wisdom of Master Chin, she and Ang successfully recharge their powerbands with no negative effects whatsoever. Elsewhere, the Emperor manages to release his younger sister Yin Wi, the Guardian of the Shadow Rat, who had been imprisoned by one of the previous Golden Dragons for a thousand years. The two siblings concoct plans to conquer the modern world and have their vengeance on all twelve guardians of yang; the Golden Dragon in particular. As they head to the Temple of the Shadow Wolf, the heroes get there first and encounter K-Lo, the Shadow Wolf Guardian who was one of Ling's allies during her dark times as the Shadow Dragon and who seems to have quite an interest in her, now that she has become one of the twin Golden Dragons.

Ultimately, the Emperor of the Darkest Yin and Me Yin succeed in finding the ancient Heart of the Black Dragon which greatly amplifies their strength tenfold. As a last resort to save all of humanity, Ang and Ling activate the dormant mystical Heart of the Golden Dragon within themselves and turn into a gigantic red-and-yellow dragon with two heads. However, the Emperor and Yin Wi escape with the great mystical powers of the Heart of the Black Dragon still at their disposal.

Characters

Main characters
Ang Leung (voiced by Alan Marriott) is seventeen years old. He is highly accomplished in martial arts and knows of the ancient philosophies of the Golden Dragon, along with his twin sister, Ling. Ang has always thought that Ling would be the next Golden Dragon, mainly because she is the better fighter. They both go with Master Chin to the Dragon Temple to select the Temple's new Guardian: to the amazement of both twins, the Powerband selects Ang as the next Golden Dragon, not Ling. To power up, Ang must say "Empower the Dragon". His Powerband is gold colored with an orange-gold gemstone which makes him muscular, lets him shoot orange/gold fire blasts and fly ("Dragon Fire"). Ang is torn once he finds out that Ling has joined the Zodiac Master and become the Shadow Dragon. Throughout the first season, Ang tries again and again to bring Ling back to the light of yang, but Ling, though she does help him out from time to time, is still bent on getting his Powerband. Ang still strongly cares about her, even if she is working for Zodiac Master. In Season 2, Ling has become the second Golden Dragon making them "Double Golden Dragons". With new abilities, they can fly, teleport, as well as become a Dragon. Ang's best friends are Xuan Chi, Guardian of the Temple of the Monkeys, as well as Beingal, Guardian of the Temple of the Tigers. Ang likes computer games and music: in fact, he devotes much of his spare time to these activities.
Ling Leung (voiced by Larissa Murray) is seventeen years old. She is highly accomplished in martial arts and knowledgeable of the ancient philosophies of the Golden Dragon. She has a twin named Ang. Ling has always thought that, since she was the better fighter, she would be the next Golden Dragon. When Ang is selected, she is left filled with hatred, depression, anger and humiliation. After leaving the Dragon Dojo, Ling is approached by the Zodiac Master, who asks her to join him with the promise that he will make her a Dragon. Ling agrees and becomes the Shadow Dragon. Her first attack on Ang fails, as he defeats her with one energy blast: she sticks with the Zodiac Master, who is trying to gain at least four of the Powerbands (preferably all of them) and revive the Emperor of Darkest Yin. Ling still cares about her twin brother, even though they are now enemies by her choice. Ling loves animals and will never harm an innocent animal. Her allegiance to the Zodiac Master often wavers based on personal or family issues. Most of the time, she fights for him, but there are occasions when she helps Ang and his friends. To power-up, Ling must say, "Empower the Shadow Dragon". Her Powerband is a dark blue/gold color. Later, she also becomes a golden Dragon and returns to the side of good, this time when they are together they must say "Empower the Double Golden Dragon" to power up. Her powerband now looks just like Ang's. In the series finale, "The Heart of the Dragon," they can use their "Double Golden Dragon" powers to turn into a Dragon with two heads, a red body and a golden stomach. Ling's only romantic interest seems to be K-ho the Shadow wolf guardian. Whenever the team needs to split up, Ling is always willing to partner with K-ho. In the last episode, Ling is seen shopping for clothes that K-ho will find attractive.
Beingal (voiced by Lucy Porter first season, Elly Fairman second season) is the barefoot Guardian of the Temple of the Tiger. The Temple is hidden on an island far away, deep in the jungle behind a waterfall. The Temple is filled with Tiger statues down each side of the aisle. She is tough and when transformed, she can fire long nails from her hands to injure her enemies. She has fallen in love with Ang, getting very angry when another girl wants to steal Ang away. She is seen to be pretty by all the other temple guardians but Ang does not notice because he has always known her. Throughout the series, subtle hints that something is going to happen between her and Ang are given away. To Power up, Beingal must say, "Empower the Tiger". Her Powerband is green colored with a red/orange gemstone, gives her Tiger stripes, lets her fire her Tiger claws at her enemies and shoot green power blasts. All of the guardians can shoot power blasts which are the color of their powerbands gemstone. An exception is Beingal whose power blasts are green.
Xuan Chi (voiced by Marc Silk) is the barefoot Guardian of the Temple of the Monkey. He is the only Temple Guardian that does not wear his Powerband, mainly because Temple Raiders raided his Temple and supposedly took his band when they kidnapped him. He escaped from them and went to the Dragon Dojo for help. Later on, he travels back to his temple to discover his Powerband was always there. The Temple Raiders came back to take it, but they lost it and Xuan has since been on a wild goose chase for his Powerband, eventually managing to get it back from the Zodiac Master. During the two-part episode "The temple of the shadow Dragon" the Emperor of the Darkest Yin, the Zodiac Master and some backup attempt to destroy the Dragon temple so that no one will be able to defeat him in the future. When a power blast from the Emperor and the Double Golden Dragons hit Xuan Chi, the power from these blasts was enough to turn him into a Monkey. His Powerband is white colored with a light green gemstone and gives him extra agility. Xuan loves his bananas and often acts like a Monkey. He is sometimes seen by others as rude and stupid, but he has been Ang's best friend since they met. His role in the series is mostly comedy relief.
Master Chin Ho (voiced by Dan Russell) used to be the Guardian of the Temple of the Pig. He now runs a little dojo/school for younger people to be hopeful future Guardians, such as Ling, Ang and Beingal. He taught Ang and Ling as their personal mentor. He is skilled in fighting and often uses old proverbs to teach Ang and his friends. He teaches Ang how to be the Golden Dragon and how to improve his skills. He is always ready for every attack. Ironically, he taught Zodiac Master before he turned evil.
The Zodiac Master (voiced by Dan Russell) is the main antagonist in season 1 of Legend of the Dragon. He got demoted to a secondary villain when his evil master, the Emperor of the Darkest Yin, immediately took over and deposed his loyal underling to his place. The Zodiac Master's real name is Woo Yin. He was born in the year of the Snake and thought he was going to be the Snake Guardian. Ultimately, the Snake Powerband selected someone different, thus he chose the powers of the darkest yin as a result. His dream is to get all the Powerbands of the Chinese Zodiac, making him invincible. His main goal is clear: Get four Powerbands and revive the Emperor of the Darkest Yin. He mainly goes after the Snake Powerband since he feels it should be his. He has a pet Snake called King Cobra and uses it as a spy or to help him in fights. When empowering a stolen Powerband, like the Snake, he would normally say "Empower the Darkest Yin, Snake". He is always a great threat to every Guardian, but Ang the Golden Dragon often saves the day. On an interesting note, despite supposedly being very powerful, he is often easily defeated even in situations in which he has the clear advantage (such as having three Powerbands to Ang only using his Dragon Powerband).
The Emperor of the Darkest Yin (voiced by Gary Martin) is the main antagonist from Episodes 26-39 in a total of fourteen episodes. He was the previous shadow Dragon prior to Ling before being locked up and he also has a younger sister named Yin Wi, the shapeshifting Shadow Rat Guardian.
Lo Wang is the Guardian of the Temple of the Rooster, an excellent strategist. His appearance and voice are based upon a young Sean Connery. His Powerband color is white with a purple/blue gemstone and gives him armor that resembles a Rooster. His character is an obvious parody of James Bond.
Chow (voiced by Dan Russell) is the Guardian of the Temple of the Dog. His Powerband is gold colored with a purple/blue gemstone and gives him more body hair, longer claws and longer teeth.
Shoong is the Guardian of the Temple of the Pig. His Powerband is black colored with a light purple gemstone, makes him more muscular than fat and gives him armor. In one episode, Shoong appears to be Ang and Xuan Chi's Master.

Supporting
Ming (voiced by Lucy Porter) is the Guardian of the Temple of the Rat. Her Powerband is black colored with a deep pink gemstone and gives her a long plait like a Rat tail and long metal 'claws' and armour. She also has similar features to the Rat, such as the teeth and her ponytail looking very similar to a Rat tail. The Rat power-band allows Ming to change into whoever she wishes. However this transformation is not perfect as there is always something noticeable one can tell the difference (such as when she turned into a Snake the Gem was seen on the back of her neck, as well as when as Ang she still had her ponytail present). Her counterpart is the Shadow Rat, who happens to be the Yin Emperor's younger sister.
Robbie is the Guardian of the Temple of the Ox. An eight-year-old boy, but when he empowers the Ox, he turns into an older man. His Power-band is gold colored with an orange-pink gemstone and gives him armor with an Ox-horned helmet.
Billy is the current Guardian of the Temple of the Ram. His power-band is gold colored with a turquoise gemstone and makes him look half-Ram half-human with curly Ram horns and rock-like skin, he is able to create small earthquakes. Like all twelve Guardians, he has a natural spiritual connection with past Ram Guardians; such as Ang and Ling's (supposedly) late mother, Mae-Ying. To activate his power-band, he calls out Empower the Ram!.
Cobra (voiced by Larissa Murray) is the Guardian of the Temple of the Snake. Her Powerband is red colored with a bright yellow gemstone and gives her green, Snake-like skin, as well as venom and a very elasticated body.
Hye is the Guardian of the Temple of the Rabbit. Seeing as she cannot afford to allow herself strong emotions, she cannot quite feel anything much for Ang, but tells Beingal that she is Ang's comrade-in-arms, as well as that she can not ever be replaced. Her Powerband is green colored with an orange gemstone but she is never seen empowered. Her first appearance is in the episode "Sister Sister".
Mana-Ho is the Guardian of the Temple of the Horse. A tall blonde woman whose laugh is reminiscent of a Horse's whinny. Her powerband color is red colored with a blue gemstone but she is never seen empowered. However, in "The Last Dragon", the Zodiac Master empowers it along with the Ram band so it probably looks similar to that.
K-Ho (voiced by Alan Marriott) is the Guardian of the Temple of the Shadow Wolf. Ling seems to be head over heels for this handsome young man, but Ang, on the other hand seems to dislike this "Lone Wolf". K-ho shows some signs that he likes Ling but does not let it interfere with his concentration. He is, unlike most of the Shadow Guardians able to care about the universal balance, not taking over the world. In the later episodes K-ho teaches Ang and Ling skills to be better Dragons, teleporting in particular. His powerband is very similar to the old shadow Dragon band before it was turned to a golden Dragon band, with a dark bluish color. To power up, he must say "Empower the Shadow Wolf".
Yin Wi (voiced by Elly Fairman) is the Guardian of the Temple of the Shadow Rat and the Emperor's younger sister. She had been imprisoned for thousands of years by an unnamed Golden Dragon of the distant past.
Victor (voiced by Marc Silk (as human) and Dan Russell (as Shadow Ox)) is the Guardian of the Temple of the Shadow Ox. Like the light Ox guardian he is also a kid.
Chang Wo is the Guardian of the Temple of the Shadow Ape.
Sabre-Claw is the Guardian of the Temple of the Shadow Tiger. He is rather cocky but, loyal towards the Emperor of the Darkest Yin. He is convinced that the power of the tiger is the strongest force to come about. He will stop at nothing to obtain Beingal's power band to unite the power of the Tiger, thus doubling his own power.
The Jaguar God is an ancient Mayan god, possibly Bahlam, worshipped by Mayan kings and their subjects, further hinted to with his mortal/human form resembling a long dead Mayan king, which strongly believed in jaguars. He has two other forms which he can transform into without powering up the Shadow Tiger, and later, Tiger bands as well as switch back with ease. His first form is a powerful black/dark greyish-blue jaguar with no spots, slightly resembling the jaguar statue he was summonded/brought back to life from using the Shadow Tiger power band, with black outlined yellow eyes. His second form is a black/dark grey were-jaguar with black spots on the sides of his torso and no tail. He appears in the episode, "Spellbound", as well as falls in love with Beingal, hypnotizing her so that she becomes his queen consort.
Tex: He is the evil counterpart of the Guardian of the Horse, and is therefore Guardian of the Shadow Stallion Temple. It is not known if Tex is his real name or just an insulting nickname Yin Wi gave him. Similar to K-Ho, he does not want to join forces with the Emperor of the Darkest Yin or Yin Wi, seeming to care more about the universal order and concord.
Mae-Ying: Ang and Ling's mother and the loving wife of the previous Golden Dragon, whose first and last appearance is in Episode 24 Lost and Found. In her younger years, she was the Guardian of the Ram, where she frequently fought alongside the Golden Dragon against the Zodiac Master. In time, she fell madly in love with the powerful Guardian of the Dragon Temple, and he with her. After their marriage and giving birth to her twins Ang and Ling, she chose to step down as Guardian of the Ram to carry out her duties as wife and mother. She was attacked by the Zodiac Master and survived, but forever lost all memory of her husband and twin children. Master Chin had then hid her away to a far off land, where she has been caring for infant goats over the next seventeen years. Although she does not recall her earlier life as Guardian of the Ram Temple, the mystical powerband recognized her as its previous wearer and shielded her from the Zodiac Master's evil magic.
Mr. Leung: He was the previous Guardian of the Golden Dragon Temple, and defender of the world from the Zodiac Master and any other adversaries, whom his own twin son has now succeeded. He eventually befriended and, as time went on, fell in love with the Guardian of the Ram Temple, May Yin. As his twin children began training with Chin, he showed deep concern for their very lives, knowing that his enemies would try to use young Ang and Ling to get to him. Therefore, he had made Chin magically erase all recollection of him from his only children. In The Last Dragon he appeared before his twin son in a vision, telling him to "watch, listen and learn". The hard truth about his actions are revealed in flashbacks between Ang and Ling when they finally regain their childhood memories of their late father. His name remains unknown.

Production
On October 6, 2001, BKN International announced the show's production as a co-production with Hong Kong-based studio Animation Enterprises.

On March 17, 2005, BKN pre-sold the series in Germany to Super RTL. Originally, the series was going to have 52 episodes produced, but this was reduced down to 36.

On June 22, 2005, BKN signed a publishing deal with The Game Factory and DeAgostini to produce multimedia based on the show.

Jeff "Swampy" Marsh was the supervising art director, and would go on to be co-creator of major children's television shows such as Phineas and Ferb

Broadcast
The series originally premiered in Latin America on Nickelodeon and eventually made its British premiere on CBBC in July 2005.

The series premiered in the US on Toon Disney's Jetix block in October 2006. Subsequently, the two-part premiere, "Trial by Fire" was shown as a Jetix Blockbuster on ABC Family in August before all Jetix programming moved to Toon Disney. The series continued to air reruns until 2009.

The last thirteen episodes of the show aired in Australia on Network Ten's Toasted TV from 19 March 2008 and ended in 2012.

Episode list

Season One

Season Two
The Temple of the Shadow Dragon, Part One

Production Number: 201

Air date: 19 March 2008 (Australia)

Written by: Sean Catherine Derek

The Emperor destroys the Temple of the Golden Dragon, forcing Ang and Ling to look for the Shadow Dragon Temple.

The Temple of the Shadow Dragon, Part Two

Production Number: 202

Air date: 20 March 2008 (Australia)

Written by: Sean Catherine Derek

Ang and Ling to travel to the Shadow Dragon Temple, to recharge their bands with Dark Yin Energy. Master Chin turns the Shadow Dragon Temple into the Double Golden Dragon Temple.

Enter the Wolf

Production Number: 203

Airdate: 21 March 2008 (Australia)

Written by: Rick Ungar

Ang and Ling encounter K-Ho, the Guardian of the Temple of the Shadow Wolf.

Cats and Dogs and Dragons

Production Number: 204

Written by: Mark Seidenberg

Our heroes set out to search for Dr. Beverly Wallis, an archaeologist friend of Master Chin's, who went missing.

Shadow Tiger Take Two

Production Number: 205

Written by: Glenn Leopold

Our heroes test Ling's latest amphibious super craft and play tourists where Wang Lee and his famous new co-star Karin Kwan are making an action packed movie.

A Horse of a Different Color

Production Number: 206

Written by: Michael Edens

Our heroes set out to White Horse in England to see if the Shadow Horse temple is indeed hidden below the famous cliffs.

Rat Attack

Production Number: 207

Written by: Len Uhley

Yin Wi's repeatedly failed attempts to steal the twin power-bands of the Golden Dragons' have left everyone drained of nearly all of their mental and spiritual energies, Ang's in particular.

Spellbound

Production Number: 208

Written by: Christy Marx and Randy Littlejohn

Yin Wi concocts a plan to show her older brother, the Emperor of the Darkest Yin, what she can do to further develop his dark powers, as well as increase them to tremendous levels.

Friend or Foe?

Production Number: 209

Written by: Dennis Haley and Marcy Brown

Yin Wi is captured by Ang and Ling's combined Dragon mystical Dragon powers. As such, she forfeits her dark powerband.

The Golden Baby-Sitter Blues

Production Number: 210

Written by: Mark Seidenberg

After Sabre-Claw runs the Ox Guardian out of the Temple of the Ox, the eight-year-old boy seeks refuge at Master Chin's dojo.

Gone Shadow Ape

Production Number: 211

Written by: Sean Catherine Derek

Ang and Master Chin are off in Hong Kong following a lead on the missing Monkey Power Band, while Ling and Beingal keep an eye on the Dragon Temple in San Francisco.

It's A Dog-Eat-Wolf World

Production Number: 212

Written by: Mark Seidenberg

Along with Ang, K-Ho goes to the wintry region and learns that a trio of ruthless men in a chopper are harassing the wolves for pleasure and for profit.

The Heart of the Black Dragon

Production Number: 213

Written by: Christy Marx and Randy Littlejohn

The Emperor and Yin Wi discover the location of a supremely powerful mystical artifact known as "the Heart of the Black Dragon" which greatly amplifies the strength of Shadow Dragons tenfold. However, Ang and Ling are in search of the mystical Heart of the Golden Dragon itself. With it, Ang and Ling succeed in stopping the Emperor and Yin Wi, who escape with the ancient dark powers of the Heart of the Black Dragon still at their disposal. Able the access the mystical powers of the Heart of the Golden Dragon from deep within them freely, Ang and Ling are ready for anything.
The show was cancelled after this cliffhanger.

Video game
A Legend of the Dragon video game was released on 1 May 2007 for the Wii, PlayStation 2, and PlayStation Portable.

Home Media

United Kingdom
BKN Home Entertainment released a 2-disc set containing the first 13 episodes of season 1 on October 23, 2006. A second 2-disc set, containing the other 13 episodes of season 1, was supposed to be released but was cancelled after BKN Home Entertainment UK ceased operations.

United States
From 2006 to 2007, Genius Entertainment released four DVD volumes that made up a portion of Season 1. The first volume was released on October 31, 2006, and contains four episodes. The second and third volumes were released on January 30, 2007, containing five episodes each. The Fourth volume was released on May 22, 2007, and contained 6 episodes. On the same day, a boxset was released containing the entirety of Series 1, including an exclusive fifth volume of six episodes. This boxset has been known for a factory manufacturing error where the sound in the episode "Hair of the Dog" cuts out after the first minute of the episode.

Image Entertainment later released all 39 episodes in a single release boxset on December 1, 2009.

Other
The complete series was released on DVD in separate volumes in Bulgaria. Each season (13 episodes) consisted of 5 2-episode DVDs and one with 3 episodes.

Comic book
In 2004, World Comics released a comic book tie-in to the series.

References

External links
 

2000s British animated television series
2005 British television series debuts
2005 German television series debuts
English-language television shows
BBC children's television shows
British children's animated fantasy television series
German children's animated fantasy television series
Jetix original programming
Martial arts television series
Works by Christopher Yost
2008 British television series endings
2008 German television series endings
Television series created by Rick Ungar
Animated television series about twins
Animated television series about dragons